Rishi Punnakhar Dhakal, is a Nepalese, US-based businessman. He is CEO of Rising International Inc which is among the largest overseas importers of Nepali ready made garments. He is also honorary consul of Nepal for the San Diego California, USA. He received the Commercially Important Person (CIP)  title in Nepal from President of Nepal, Dr. Ram Baran Yadav. He is also Vice-President of the Shree Pashupatinath Foundation, USA.

References

Nepalese businesspeople
Year of birth missing (living people)
Living people